Ricasetron (BRL-46470) is a drug which acts as a selective antagonist at the serotonin 5-HT3 receptor. It has antiemetic effects as with other 5-HT3 antagonists, and also has anxiolytic effects significantly stronger than other related drugs, and with less side effects than benzodiazepine anxiolytics. However, it has never been developed for medical use.

See also 
Zatosetron
Bemesetron
Tropanserin
Tropisetron
Granisetron

References 

5-HT3 antagonists
Tropanes
Ureas
Indoles